Hedong Subdistrict is a subdistrict in Chengzhong District, Liuzhou, Guangxi, China. , it has 5 residential communities and 2 villages under its administration.

See also 
 List of township-level divisions of Guangxi

References 

Township-level divisions of Guangxi
Liuzhou
Subdistricts of the People's Republic of China